Erl is a municipality of 1,400 inhabitants in the Kufstein district in western Austria. It lies 15 km north of the administrative town of Kufstein in the northern part of the Tyrol, at the border with Bavaria, Germany.

Settlement began in the third century; Erl is mentioned in documents dating back to A.D. 788. The village has hosted a Passion play every six years since 1613 as well as the more recently founded summer and wintertime Tyrolean Festival, founded by Gustl Kuhn, which is devoted to classical music and opera.

Neighbouring municipalities 
    Nußdorf am Inn, B, North
    Samerberg, B, NE
    Aschau im Chiemgau, B, East
    Niederndorferberg, T, SE
    Niederndorf T, South
    Oberaudorf, B, SW
    Flintsbach am Inn, B, West

T = Tirol, Austria, B = Bayern, Germany

References

External links 
Tyrol Festival 

Cities and towns in Kufstein District